Bear Peninsula is a peninsula about 80 km (50 mi) long and 40 km (25 mi) wide which is ice covered except for several isolated rock bluffs and outcrops along its margins, lying 48 km 30 mi) east of Martin Peninsula on Walgreen Coast, Marie Byrd Land, Antarctica.

First delineated from aerial photographs taken by USN Operation Highjump in January 1947. Named by the Advisory Committee on Antarctic Names (US-ACAN) after the ice-ship USS Bear, flagship of the USAS, from which three reconnaissance flights were made in late February 1940, resulting in the discovery of Walgreen Coast (with probable sighting of this feature) and the Thurston Island area. This ship, under the name Bear of Oakland, also served as flagship of the Byrd AE, 1933–35, which based at the Bay of Whales, Ross Ice Shelf. Launched in 1874 at Greenock, Scotland, for use in the sealing trade, she sank in 30-foot seas and high winds in the North Atlantic, March 19, 1963, at which time she was being towed from Nova Scotia to Philadelphia.

Geography 

Bear Peninsula is large enough that numerous features along its coast and inland have been charted and individually named. Unless specified, the features noted below were first mapped by the United States Geological Survey (USGS) from air photos obtained by Operation Highjump in 1947 as well as surveys and U.S. Navy aerial photographs taken between 1959–66, and were named by the Advisory Committee on Antarctic Names (US-ACAN).

West coast 

It was named after Lieutenant Robert B. Hunt, U.S. Navy Reserve, a medical officer with the Byrd Station winter party, 1966.  north is a conspicuous rock bluff called Jeffery Head, named after Stuart S. Jeffery, a researcher in ionospheric physics at Byrd Station in 1966.  north of that is Brush Glacier.

Ber Peninsula's northernmost point is ice-covered Koloc Point, named after Lieutenant Commander Bohumil Koloc, Jr., a U.S. Navy helicopter pilot during Operation Deep Freeze 1966 and 1967.

East coast 

The northeast portion of Bear Peninsula is called Gurnon Peninsula. It was named after Lieutenant P.J. Gurnon, a Lockheed Hercules aircraft commander in Antarctica during Operation Deep Freeze 1965–67. Hummer Point is the eastern point of Gurnon Peninsula. It was named after Dr. Michael G. Hummer.

Ice-covered Merrick Point sits on its east side. These features were named in 1977. The piedmont was named for Robert Hamilton, a meteorologist at the University of California, Davis, who was United States Antarctic Research Program Station Scientific Leader at South Pole Station, winter party 1975. The point was named for Dale Merrick of Stanford University, upper atmosphere researcher and Station Scientific Leader at Siple Station, winter party 1975.

Continuing south on the east coast, the next notable feature is Grimes Ridge, a high, mostly ice-covered ridge at the north side of Holt Glacier. It was named after Captain E.W. Grimes, a member of the U.S. Army Aviation Detachment that provided Antarctic support during Operation Deep Freeze. Goepfert Bluff sits at its east end. It was named in 1977 after Lieutenant Eric R. Goepfert, U.S. Navy, officer in charge of the U.S. Naval Support Force, Antarctica, winter detachment at McMurdo Station, 1976.

See also
Harmon Bay
Wright Pass

References

Peninsulas of Ellsworth Land